The Gyeongwon Line is a railway line serving northeastern Gyeonggi Province in South Korea. The line is operated by Korail. The name of the line came from Gyeongseong (Seoul) and Wonsan, the original terminus of the line, in what is now North Korea.

History
For the original line's history and other information prior to 1945, see Gyeongwon Line (1911–1945)

One of the first construction projects undertaken by the Railway Bureau of the Government General of Korea was for an east−west trunk line to connect Gyeongseong to the important port of Wonsan. The Chosen Government Railway (Sentetsu) opened the line in several stages between 1911 and 1914. The first section of mainline to be electrified by Sentetsu was also along the Gyeongwon Line, with the Pokkye−Gosan section being energised on 27 March 1944, as part of a plan made jointly with the South Manchuria Railway for an electrified railway all the way from Busan to Xinjing, capital of Manchukuo.

After the partition of Korea following the end of the Pacific War in 1945, the Gyeongwon Line was split along the 38th parallel between the stations of Hantangang and Choseongni. The railways in both South and North were nationalised, and the newly-established Korean National Railroad took over operation of the truncated Gyeongwon Line, from Seoul to Choseongni; in the North, the Korean State Railway merged its section of the Gyeongwon Line, Choseong-ri−Wonsan, with the Wonsan−Gowon section of the former Hamgyeong Line to create the Gangwon Line.

The line was severely damaged during the Korean War. After the ceasefire and the subsequent establishment of the Military Demarcation Line, the division of the line changed, with the South gaining control of the line further northwards as far as Woljeongni.

Following the 1961 coup, the Supreme Council for National Reconstruction started South Korea's first five-year plan, which included a construction program to complete the railway network, to foster economic growth.

Upgrade

The section of the Gyeongwon Line in the Seoul metropolitan area was among the first to be electrified with the 25 kV/60 Hz AC catenary system in South Korea when to allow for through train services with Seoul Subway Line 1. Further sections were electrified and urban services to Line 1 was extended in the 1980s and then in the 2000s:

On September 1, 2010, the South Korean government announced a strategic plan to reduce travel times from Seoul to 95% of the country to under 2 hours by 2020. As part of the plan, the Gyeongwon Line is to be further upgraded until Uijeongbu for 230 km/h and may see KTX service.

In 2012 restoration of the line was completed between Sintan-ri and Cheorwon.

Route
A yellow background in the "Distance" box indicates that section of the line is not electrified.

See also
 Korail
 Korean State Railway
 Transportation in South Korea

References

 Japanese Government Railways (1937), 鉄道停車場一覧. 昭和12年10月1日現在(The List of the Stations as of 1 October 1937), Kawaguchi Printing Company, Tokyo, pp 495–496

External links

 
Korail lines
Railway lines in South Korea
Standard gauge railways in South Korea
Railway lines opened in 1914
1911 establishments in Korea